The 2022 Leinster Senior Camogie Championship was run as a standalone competition in April and May 2022. It was not part of the 2022 All-Ireland Senior Camogie Championship. Kilkenny beat Dublin in the final. The second-tier competition, the 2022 Leinster Intermediate Camogie Championship, was won by Meath. The third tier competition, the 2022 Leinster Junior Camogie Championship, was won by Wicklow.

Teams

5 teams took part in a knock-out competition.

 Dublin
 Kilkenny
 Offaly
 Westmeath
 Wexford

Knockout stage

Preliminary round

Semi-finals

Final

References 

2022 in camogie